Rudolph A. Kling   (March 23, 1870 – March 14, 1937), was a professional baseball player who played shortstop in the Major Leagues for the St. Louis Cardinals in 1902.

External links

1870 births
1937 deaths
Major League Baseball shortstops
Baseball players from Missouri
St. Louis Cardinals players
Minor league baseball managers
Lima Kids players
Mansfield Kids players
Cedar Rapids Bunnies players
Charleston Seagulls players
Bloomington Blues players
Terre Haute Hottentots players
Evansville River Rats players
Oakland Oaks (baseball) players
Monroe Hill Citys players
Springfield Highlanders players
St. Joseph Packers players
Hutchinson Salt Packers players
Wichita Jobbers players
Dubuque Dubs players
Helena Hellions players
Great Bend Millers players
Clarinda Antelopes players
Hastings Third Citys players
Flandreau Indians players